Join Together is a box set of live material released from The Who's 1989 25th Anniversary Tour. Several of the tracks were recorded at Radio City Music Hall, New York, and at Universal Amphitheatre, Los Angeles, with the rest from various other concerts during the tour.

The live rendition of Tommy (1969) was compiled from two charity shows, on 27 June at New York City's Radio City Music Hall and on 24 August at the Universal Amphitheatre in Los Angeles. Songs from disc two originated from 6 concerts (verified by comparison with audience recordings from the tour).

It was released in 1990 by Virgin Records in the UK and MCA Records in the US. The album was released in the US as a vinyl three LP set in March 1990, where it reached #180 in the US charts. It was also released on cassette tape, and later released on MCA as a two-CD set. The box set included a full colour booklet including credits and pictures from the tour, and was dedicated to Keith Moon.

Track listing
All songs written by Pete Townshend except where noted.

Personnel
The Who
Roger Daltrey – lead vocals, tambourine, harmonica, acoustic guitar, rhythm guitar
Pete Townshend – lead guitar, acoustic guitar, rhythm guitar, lead and backing vocals
John Entwistle – bass, backing and lead vocals

Additional musicians
Simon Phillips – drums
Steve "Boltz" Bolton – rhythm and lead guitar
John Bundrick – keyboards
Billy Nicholls – backing vocals, musical director
Cleveland Watkiss – backing vocals
Chyna Gordon – backing vocals
Jody Linscott – percussion
Simon Clarke – brass
Simon Gardner – brass
Roddy Lorimer – brass
Tim Saunders – brass
Neil Sidwell – brass

Design
 Cover design by Richard Evans
 Photography by Chalkie Davies and Carol Starr

Charts

References

External links 
 The Who - Join Together (1990) album review by Stephen Thomas Erlewine, credits & releases at AllMusic
 The Who - Join Together (1990) album releases & credits at Discogs.com
 The Who - Join Together (1990) album to be listened as stream at Spotify.com

The Who live albums
1990 live albums
MCA Records live albums
Virgin Records live albums